The 1992 UEFA European Football Championship was hosted by Sweden between 10 and 26 June 1992. It was the ninth UEFA European Championship, which is held every four years and supported by UEFA.

Denmark won the 1992 championship, having qualified only after Yugoslavia was disqualified as a result of the breakup of the country and the ensuing warfare there. Eight national teams contested the final tournament.

The CIS national football team (Commonwealth of Independent States), representing the recently dissolved Soviet Union, whose national team had qualified for the tournament, were present at the tournament. It was also the first major tournament in which the reunified Germany (who were beaten 2–0 by Denmark in the final) had competed.

It was the last tournament with only eight participants, to award the winner of a match with only two points, and before the introduction of the back-pass rule, the latter of which was brought in immediately after the tournament was completed. When the next competition was held in 1996, 16 teams were involved and were awarded three points for a win.

Bid process
On 16 December 1988, following a decision made by the UEFA Executive Committee, Sweden was chosen over Spain to host the event. Spain was at a disadvantage as they had already been chosen to host the EXPO 1992 in Seville and the 1992 Summer Olympics in Barcelona.

Summary
Seven of the eight teams had to qualify for the final stage; Sweden qualified automatically as hosts of the event. The Soviet Union qualified for the final tournament shortly before the break-up of the country, and took part in the tournament under the banner of the Commonwealth of Independent States (CIS), before the former Soviet republics formed their own national teams after the competition. The CIS team represented the following former Soviet nations: Russia, Ukraine, Belarus, Kazakhstan, Uzbekistan, Turkmenistan, Kyrgyzstan, Armenia, Azerbaijan, Moldova, and Tajikistan. Four out of 15 ex-republics were not members of the CIS: Estonia, Latvia and Lithuania did not send their players; Georgia was not a member of the CIS at the time, but Georgian Kakhaber Tskhadadze was a part of the squad.

Originally, Yugoslavia qualified for the final stage and were about to participate as FR Yugoslavia, but due to the Yugoslav Wars, the team was disqualified and Denmark, as the runners-up from Yugoslavia's qualifying group, was invited to take part instead. After a draw with England and a loss to host nation Sweden, Denmark beat France in their final group match to qualify for the semi-finals, where they would face the reigning European champions, the Netherlands. Denmark led 2–1 going into the last five minutes, but a Frank Rijkaard equaliser meant the game went to a penalty shoot-out; Danish goalkeeper Peter Schmeichel saved Marco van Basten's kick, giving Denmark a 5–4 win on penalties and a place in the final against reigning world champions Germany. Denmark won the final 2–0 with goals from John Jensen and Kim Vilfort in either half to claim their first European title.

Qualification

Scotland and the hosts Sweden made their debuts despite having already made many appeareances at the World Cup. France qualified for the first Euro in which they are not the hosts. They played after missing out the previous tournament. 

As of 2020, this is the last time the Czech Republic (then Czechoslovakia), Italy, Portugal and Spain failed to qualify for the European Championship finals.

Qualified teams

Final draw
The draw for the final tournament took place on 17 January 1992 in Gothenburg. Only two teams were seeded: Sweden (as hosts) and the Netherlands (as holders). The remaining six teams were all unseeded and could be drawn in any group. Months after the draw, Yugoslavia was banned from participating and replaced by Denmark, which had come second in the qualifying group.

In the draw procedure, the unseeded teams were drawn one by one. The first two were placed in position 4 of each group, the next two in position 3, and the last 2 in position 2. The two seeded teams were then drawn and placed consecutively into position 1 of the groups.

The draw resulted in the following groups:

Venues

Squads

Each national team had to submit a squad of 20 players.

Match ball
Adidas Etrusco Unico was used as the official match ball of the tournament. The ball was previously used in the 1990 FIFA World Cup.

Match officials

Fourth officials

Group stage

The teams finishing in the top two positions in each of the two groups progress to the semi-finals, while the bottom two teams in each group were eliminated from the tournament.

All times are local, CEST (UTC+2).

Tiebreakers
If two or more teams finished level on points after completion of the group matches, the following tie-breakers were used to determine the final ranking:
Greater number of points in all group matches
Goal difference in all group matches
Greater number of goals scored in all group matches
Drawing of lots

Group 1

Group 2

Knockout stage

In the knockout phase, extra time and a penalty shoot-out were used to decide the winner if necessary. As with every tournament since UEFA Euro 1984, there was no third place play-off.

All times are local, CEST (UTC+2).

Bracket

Semi-finals

Final

Statistics

Goalscorers

Awards
UEFA Team of the Tournament

Marketing

Slogan and theme song

Small is Beautiful was the official slogan of the contest. The official anthem of the tournament was "More Than a Game", performed by Towe Jaarnek and Peter Jöback.

Logo and identity
It was the last tournament to use the UEFA plus flag logo, and before the tournament was known as "Euro" (it is known as "Euro 1992" only retrospectively). It was also the first major football competition in which the players had their names printed on their backs, around the time that it was becoming a trend in club football across Europe.

Mascot
The official mascot of the competition was a rabbit named Rabbit, dressed in a Swedish football jersey, as well as wearing head and wristbands while playing with a ball.

Sponsorship

References

External links

UEFA Euro 1992 at UEFA.com

 
1992
1991–92 in European football
1992 in Swedish football
1992
June 1992 sports events in Europe